Doan Hoang or Đoan Hoàng is a Vietnamese-American documentary film director, producer, editor, and writer. She directed and produced the 2007 documentary Oh, Saigon about her family, after leaving Vietnam on the last civilian helicopter as Saigon fell. The documentary won several awards at film festivals and was broadcast on PBS from 2008 to 2012. Hoang was selected to be a delegate to Spain for the American Documentary Showcase.

Biography
Hoang was born in South Vietnam, and is the daughter of a former South Vietnamese air force major from Saigon and a former Mekong Delta plantation heiress. On April 30, 1975, she was airlifted on the final civilian helicopter out of Vietnam at the end of the war. Four months afterwards, she settled in Louisville, Kentucky. When she was nine, she wrote her first book on the Vietnam War. At the age of 12, she made her first documentary The French Revolution. She graduated from Smith College in 1994.

Hoang worked as an editor and writer for national magazines, including Details, Saveur, House & Garden, Garden Design, and Spin.

Hoang developed the film Oh, Saigon, in which she documented her family, over seven years. In 2005, the Sundance Institute awarded Hoang a grant for the then titled Homeland. She also received funding from the Independent Television Service (ITVS), the Center for Asian American Media, and the Corporation for Public Broadcasting.

Hoang premiered Oh, Saigon in March 2007 at the San Francisco International Asian American Film Festival, and received a nomination for Best Documentary. She had her New York premiere at the Museum of Modern Art in 2008. At the Los Angeles Asian Pacific Film Festival, her film received the Grand Jury Prize. It won the Best Film and Best Feature Documentary at the 42nd Brooklyn Arts Council International Film Festival in 2008. It also screened at the Vietnam International Film Festival. In 2011 and 2012, as part of the American Documentary Showcase, Hoang took the film to 16 countries, including Spain and Vietnam. She screened the film in Vietnam for the US Department of State at the US Embassy and the US Consulate. She was also invited by the Ambassador of Vietnam to the United Nations, Lê Hoài Trung, to return for an overseas Vietnamese senate.

Hoang heads her own film production company, Nuoc Pictures, located in New York City. She is producing a follow-up to Oh, Saigon called Scars For Eyes. Hoang describes the film as "about the women in her family who unbeknownst to each other, share the same terrible secret." The film will feature animation and is partly funded by grants from the Asian Women's Giving Circle and the Ms. Foundation.

In addition to French Revolution, Hoang has worked on a number of short films: A Requiem for Vegetables describes "the massacre of vegetables by a scary 1950s homemaker"; Good Morning, Captains features two Gen-Xers that are involved in a car accident; and Agent depicts the impact of a CIA agent's life on his family. American Geisha is a documentary of Hoang's aunt Yen, who had served as a geisha for Japanese businessmen in San Francisco. In 2013, she helped produce and direct a music video for pop singer Emily Newhouse called "Addicted to the Internet", which was featured at the Greenpoint Film Festival in Brooklyn.

Other ventures
In 2002–2006, Hoang had a yoga studio called Om Shanti in Weehawken, New Jersey. Hoang also set up a bicycle helmet company called Tat Hats. In 2009, Hoang founded the Los Angeles-based Camellia Creative Catering & Events, specializing in international cuisine made with locally-sourced organic food.

Filmography

Feature films
 Oh, Saigon (2007)
 The Trail of Ho (2008)
 Legacy of Denial (2009)
 Side Man, in post-production
 Scars For Eyes, in post-production

Short films
 French Revolution (1984)
 A Requiem for Vegetables (1993)
 How Not To Make A Video (1994)
 Good Morning, Captains (1994)
 Nuoc (2000)
 Agent (2002)
 American Geisha (2011)
 Hard Times (2012) - co-producer
 "Addicted to the Internet" by Emily Newhouse (2013 music video)

References

External links
  at Oh Saigon official website
ITVS Press release for "Oh, Saigon"  at ITVS – includes some Doan Hoang biographic material.
Interview with Doan Hoang by Nerd Society

1972 births
Vietnamese emigrants to the United States
Smith College alumni
Vietnamese film directors
Vietnamese women film directors
Living people
Writers from Louisville, Kentucky
American documentary filmmakers
Vietnamese documentary filmmakers
Seneca High School (Louisville, Kentucky) alumni
Film directors from Kentucky
American women documentary filmmakers
21st-century American women
Vietnamese film producers